Todd Roy is an American producer, director, writer and actor who is best known for his role as director and producer on the reality online series The Jace Hall Show. He currently is a creative director and producer at HD FILMS, INC. and produces/directs Fandango's new series Movie3Some.

Online series 

Todd Roy is the producer-director-creator of Cardio World The Series, which is syndicated on Crave Online and YouTube. Cardio World is a health and wellness online series starring BSN Fitness and Oxygen Magazine model Alicia Marie.

In 1999, Todd Roy created KWOON, an online-based martial arts comedy series. The series followed the adventures of five kung fu students fighting the forces of evil in Silicon Valley.  Three 22-minute episodes were produced for the Internet and DVD.
 
Roy produced and directed The Jace Hall Show, which was syndicated on IGN and on Hulu.
 
Roy has also produced the online series Chadam and The Legend of Neil.

Awards 

Roy received the Webby Award for Best Web Comedy and Director for his work on the Jace Hall Show, among fellow nominees ESPN, Sony, and NBC.

References

External links 

Jace Hall Show
Press Release For Everquest Documentary Featuring Todd Roy

American film producers
Living people
American male video game actors
Year of birth missing (living people)